There are two hills in Hampshire called Beacon Hill; the other one is near Burghclere

Beacon Hill, Warnford is a  biological Site of Special Scientific Interest west of Warnford in Hampshire. There is a round barrow cemetery dating to the Late Neolithic or Bronze Age on the hill, and this is a scheduled monument.

Location
The hill lies to the west of the Meon Valley and opposite Old Winchester Hill. It gives a commanding view over the Hampshire Basin to the south, from the lower Itchen Valley and New Forest, the Solent and Isle of Wight and round to Portsdown Hill (over which the top of Portsmouth's Spinnaker Tower can be seen). On the eastern side the view takes in the Meon Valley including Meonstoke and West Meon, and the South Downs including Old Winchester Hill and Butser Hill. The spire of Privett church can be seen to the north.

The hill is crossed by two long-distance footpaths, the South Downs Way and the Monarch's Way. Due to the fragile nature of the thin chalk soils there has been much controversy over routing. At present there are temporary routes to the north of the main summit via Warnford, and to the south via Exton.

SSSI
The site consists of the steep slopes of a chalk spur on the western side of the Meon valley, covered by chalk grassland, beech / ash / hazel woodland and chalk scrub. There are two separate parts, which are not joined to each other. The smaller, separate northern section (centred on ) is a strip of grassland on a north-facing slope of the northern of the hill's two eastern spurs.

The grassland at the site has sheep's fescue (Festuca ovina), salad burnet (Sanguisorba minor) and common rock-rose (Helianthemum nummularium) as its dominant species. Other species present are horseshoe vetch (Hippocrepis comosa), yellow-wort (Blackstonia perfoliata), fragrant orchid (Gymnadenia conopsea) and clustered bellflower (Campanula glomerata).

The grassland supports several rarer species - rampion (Phyteuma tenerum), field fleawort (Senecio integrifolius), hairy rock-cress (Arabis hirsuta) and man orchid (Aceras anthropophorum'').

The site's butterfly fauna in mentioned as in its citation sheet. Twenty-five species are known to breed, including colonies of silver-spotted skipper and Duke of Burgundy, together with comparatively large populations of brown argus, green hairstreak, chalkhill blue, marbled white and dingy skipper.

Geology

Structure
The structural picture is similar to that at Winchester  to the west, with an east–west trending anticline in the upper chalk (the Winchester-East Meon Anticline) cut through by a south-flowing river to expose an inlier of middle and lower chalk. As with the Itchen, the upper Meon flows westwards along the fold trend, before swinging south to cut through the anticline. The anticline is somewhat domed, with the result that Old Winchester Hill is capped by older chalk than Beacon Hill despite being rather higher, whilst Wether Down and Butser Hill to the east are higher still.

Geomorphology
Beacon Hill is a section of east-facing Upper Chalk escarpment. Both Beacon Hill and Old Winchester Hill have a claim to being the point at which the main north-facing scarp of the South Downs turns northwards around the western end of the Weald; Beacon Hill is lower, but represents a higher level within the chalk, and Old Winchester Hill is cut to the north by the upper Meon valley. Small  suggests that the upper Meon (which like the upper Itchen flows east–west) was originally a headwater of the Itchen following the col to the north of Beacon Hill, before the south-flowing lower Meon cut back through the chalk.

The hill has been incised by a series of steep-sided semi-circular combes to the east, and deep dry valleys to the south and west. Between these several radiating spurs with minor roads and tracks meet near the summit.

External links
United Kingdom Butterfly Monitoring Scheme
Natural England - SSSI Unit 1 - Woodland
Natural England - SSSI Unit 3 - Calcareous grassland

References

National nature reserves in England
Nature Conservation Review sites
Sites of Special Scientific Interest in Hampshire
Hills of Hampshire
Late Neolithic